Waterloo was launched in 1815 at Sunderland. She traded with Hamburg, Trieste, and Tobago, before sailing to the Cape of Good Hope with emigrants. She was lost at Fish Hoek on 25 October 1821; the wreckage and cargo was sold there on 6 November.


Career
Waterloo first appeared in Lloyd's Register (LR) in 1815 with J.Hann, master, Grenville, owner, and trade London–Hambro.

On 25 May 1817, Waterloo, Hann, master, arrived at Trieste from London. On 28 October she arrived at Barcelona from Odessa.

LR for 1822 showed Waterloo with D[avid] [Thomson] Lyon, master, J&P Nichols, owners, and trade London–CGH.

On 9 February 1821 Waterloo, Lyon, master, sailed from Portsmouth for the Cape. She was carrying 61 settlers under the auspices of the Government Settler Scheme. (Twenty eight vessels left that year and the next with settlers for South Africa.) She arrived at the Cape on 24 May.

Fate
On 25 October 1821 Waterloo, Lyon, master, was driven ashore at Fish Hook Bay, Cape of Good Hope. The next day she was a total wreck. Her crew were rescued. She was carrying whale oil, some of which was also saved. 

At the time, there was a whale oil factory at Fish Hoek (or Visch Hoek). After she wrecked an auction on the beach of what was left of the cargo she had been loading and of her masts, rigging, and whatever else was left. Early in November the Cape Town Gazette and African Adviser published a notice that on 6 November there would be a sale on the beach at Fisch Hoek Bay of Waterloos masts, yards, sails, rigging, boat, provisions, furniture, material and damaged cargo saved from the wreck, as well as her anchors and cables, and that part of her cargo that had not been recovered.

The remains of the wreck now lie in some seven meters of water.

One source assigns this Waterloos fate to a different .

Citations

References
 
 
 

1815 ships
Age of Sail merchant ships of England
Ships of the 1820 settlers
Maritime incidents in October 1821